Anthony Burton is the name of:

 Anthony Burton (cricketer, born 1975), former English cricketer
 Anthony Burton (Kent cricketer) (1785–1850), English cricketer
 Tony Burton (bishop) (born 1959), former Anglican Bishop of Saskatchewan
 Tony Burton (1937–2016), American actor
 Anthony Burton (curator), British museum curator